Matías Manzano (born June 17, 1986 in Córdoba, Argentina) is an Argentine football forward.

Clubs

References
 
 

1986 births
Living people
Argentine footballers
Argentine expatriate footballers
Gimnasia y Esgrima de Jujuy footballers
Racing de Córdoba footballers
Alianza Atlético footballers
Cobresal footballers
Talleres de Córdoba footballers
Getafe CF B players
Club Blooming players
Expatriate footballers in Chile
Expatriate footballers in Peru
Expatriate footballers in Spain
Expatriate footballers in Bolivia
Association football forwards
Footballers from Córdoba, Argentina
Argentine expatriate sportspeople in Venezuela
Argentine expatriate sportspeople in Greece
Argentine expatriate sportspeople in Bolivia